
Gmina Brwinów is an urban-rural gmina (administrative district) in Pruszków County, Masovian Voivodeship, in east-central Poland.

Villages
Apart from the town of Brwinów, Gmina Brwinów contains the villages and settlements of Biskupice, Czubin, Domaniew, Domaniewek, Falęcin, Grudów, Kanie, Kopana, Koszajec, Kotowice, Krosna-Wieś, Milęcin, Moszna-Wieś, Otrębusy, Owczarnia, Parzniew, Popówek, Terenia and Żółwin.

Neighbouring gminas
Gmina Brwinów is bordered by the towns of Milanówek, Podkowa Leśna and Pruszków, and by the gminas of Błonie, Grodzisk Mazowiecki, Michałowice, Nadarzyn and Ożarów Mazowiecki.

References
Polish official population figures 2006

Brwinow
Pruszków County